This is a list of banks in Spain. Spain has 10 banking groups that are directly supervised by the European Central Bank. As of September 2021, the "big four" in Spain are:
 Banco Santander
 BBVA
 Caixabank
 Banco Sabadell
There were formerly a "big six" (los seis grandes) composed of three banks that are now part of BBVA (Banco de Bilbao, Banco de Vizcaya, and state-owned Banco Argentaria) and three now combined as Santander (Banco Central, Banco Hispanoamericano, and Banco de Santander).

List of banks by total assets

Central bank
Bank of Spain

Major banks
Banco Santander
Banco Bilbao Vizcaya Argentaria 
CaixaBank
Banco Sabadell
Bankinter
Kutxabank
Abanca
Banca March

Smaller banks
N26

References

External links
 The best banks for expats in Spain

 
Banks
Spain
Spain